Grevillea preissii is a species of flowering plant in the family Proteaceae and is endemic to the southwest of Western Australia. It is a mounded to spreading or dense, erect shrub, the leaves divided with 5 to 7 linear to more or less cylindrical lobes, and groups of reddish flowers arranged along one side of the flowering rachis.

Description
The edges of the leaves are rolled under, obscuring most of the lower surface.

TaxonomyGrevillea preissii was first formally described in 1845 by Carl Meissner in Johann Georg Christian Lehmann's Plantae Preissianae. The specific epithet (preissii) honours Ludwig Preiss.

In 1994, Peter M. Olde and Neil R. Marriott described two subspecies of G. preissii and the names are accepted by the Australian Plant Census:

Distribution and habitatGrevillea preissiisubsp. glabrilimba grows in low heath, in near-coastal areas between Green Head and Leeman and subsp. preissii is found in coastal areas between Lancelin and Bunbury, in the southwest of Western Australia.

Conservation status
Bothe subspecies of G. preissii'' are listed as "not threatened" by the Western Australian Government Department of Biodiversity, Conservation and Attractions.

References

preissii
Endemic flora of Western Australia
Eudicots of Western Australia
Proteales of Australia
Taxa named by Carl Meissner
Garden plants of Australia
Plants described in 1845